The Manhattan Community Board 8 is a New York City community board encompassing the Upper East Side, including the neighborhoods of Lenox Hill, Yorkville, and Roosevelt Island in the borough of Manhattan. It is delimited by the East River on the east, 59th Street on the south, Central Park on the west and 96th Street on the north. 

Its current Chair is Russell Squire and its District Manager is Will Brightbill.

Demographics
As of 2000, the Community Board had a population of 217,063, up from 210,880 in 1990 and 204,305 in 1980. Of them (as of 2000), 179,355 (82.6%) were White non-Hispanic, 6,907 (3.2%) were African-American, 13,778 (6.3%) Asian or Pacific Islander, 126 (0.1%) American Indian or Native Alaskan, 618 (0.3%) of some other race, 3,952 (1.5%) of two or more races, 3,253 (6.0%) of Hispanic origins. 4.8% of the population benefitted from public assistance as of 2009, up from 2.8% in 2000.

References

External links
Community Board 8 - Official Website

Community boards of Manhattan